Alexander City, known to locals as "Alex City", is the largest city in Tallapoosa County, Alabama, United States, with a population of 14,843 as of the 2020 census. It has been the largest community in Tallapoosa County since 1910. Lake Martin stands on the Tallapoosa River and offers boating, swimming, fishing, golfing, and camping. Many neighborhoods and luxury homes are located on the lake.

The city's economy was traditionally based on the textile industry, but in recent times its economic base has become more diversified as textile jobs have gone to India.

History
Alexander City was incorporated in 1872 as Youngsville, after its founder James Young. In 1873, the Savannah and Memphis Railroad came to the city. The city was renamed in honor of the railroad's President Edward Porter Alexander, hero of the Battle of Gettysburg for the Confederate States. On July 20, 1897, George Richardson got lynched.

On June 13, 1902, at 1 pm, a fire broke out in the Alexander City Machine shop and destroyed much of the town. At the time, Alexander City did not have a water system and all buildings, including the telegraph office, post office and three banks were burned.

In 2015, plaintiffs represented by the Southern Poverty Law Center sued the City of Alexander and its Chief of Police Willie Robinson in federal court, alleging that they had from 2013 to 2015 operated "a modern-day debtors' prison" that unconstitutionally used its police force to arrest and detain at least 190 poor defendants who were unable to pay Municipal Court-imposed fines and costs. In 2017, the city reached a settlement, in which the city and its insurer agreed to pay $680,000 to persons illegally jailed.

Geography
Alexander City is located at  (32.933157, -85.936008).

Alexander City is located on U.S. Route 280.

Climate
The climate in this area is characterized by hot, humid summers and generally mild to cool winters.  According to the Köppen Climate Classification system, Alexander City has a humid subtropical climate, abbreviated "Cfa" on climate maps.

Demographics

Alexander City first appeared on the 1880 U.S. Census as an incorporated city. At that time, it was the largest community in the county (though would lose the distinction to Dadeville for 1890–1900, reclaiming the title and holding it since 1910).

Alexander City was the principal city of the former Alexander City Micropolitan Statistical Area, a micropolitan area that covered Coosa and Tallapoosa counties and had a combined population of 53,677 at the 2000 census. The micropolitan statistical area was removed in 2013 by the United States Office of Management and Budget.

2010 census
At the 2010 census there were 14,875 people in 6,064 households, including 4,050 families, in the city. There were 6,834 housing units at an average density of 176.1 per square mile (68/km). The racial makeup of the city was 62.2% White, 32.0% Black or African American, 0.2% Native American, 0.9% Asian, 0.0% Pacific Islander, 3.8% from other races, and 0.9% from two or more races. 4.8% of the population were Hispanic or Latino of any race.
Of the 6,064 households 27.5% had children under the age of 18 living with them, 42.2% were married couples living together, 20.1% had a female householder with no husband present, and 33.2% were non-families. 29.7% of households were one person and 13.2% were one person aged 65 or older. The average household size was 2.40 and the average family size was 2.95.

The age distribution was 23.5% under the age of 18, 8.7% from 18 to 24, 24.2% from 25 to 44, 26.0% from 45 to 64, and 17.5% 65 or older. The median age was 39.8 years. For every 100 females, there were 89.8 males. For every 100 women age 18 and over, there were 90.9 men.

The median household income was $34,782 and the median family income  was $44,455. Males had a median income of $34,515 versus $31,250 for females. The per capita income for the city was $20,097. About 17.0% of families and 20.5% of the population were below the poverty line, including 30.7% of those under age 18 and 14.3% of those age 65 or over.

2020 census

As of the 2020 United States Census, there were 14,843 people, 5,710 households, and 3,872 families residing in the city.

Youngville/Alexander City Precinct/Division (1870-)

The beat (precinct) containing Alexander City first appeared on the 1870 U.S. Census as "Youngville" (2nd beat of Tallapoosa County), which was the prior name of Alexander City. In 1880, the 2nd beat of Youngville and the 1st beat of Gold Branch reported a combined population, as neither was returned separately. Beginning in 1890, the name was changed to the Alexander (2nd) Precinct (not "Alexander City"). The precinct name would not change until 1950 when it reported as Alexander City. In 1960, Alexander City precinct was changed to census division as part of a general reorganization of counties.

Government
Alexander City uses a mayor-council government. The government consists of a mayor who is elected at large. The city council consists of six members who are elected from one of six districts.

The city has a police department.

In 2016, Mayor Charles Shaw and his wife were charged with assault following a council meeting brawl with a member of the city council. Following a bench trial, the mayor was convicted of misdemeanor third-degree assault, but his wife was acquitted. The mayor was given a suspended sentence of 30 days in jail and one year of unsupervised probation.

Education
Alexander City Public Schools are part of the Alexander City Schools district.

Schools in the district include Jim Pearson Elementary School, Nathaniel H. Stephens Elementary School, William L. Radney Elementary School, Alexander City Middle School and Benjamin Russell High School.

Dr. J. Darrell Cooper is the Superintendent of Schools.

Economy
Russell Corporation, maker of Russell Athletic, Cross Creek, Jerzees, and Country Cottons apparel, was founded in 1902 and was the largest employer in the city until around 2012. On April 17, 2006, Russell Corporation was bought by Berkshire Hathaway/Fruit of the Loom for an estimated $600 million. Since about 1998, the number of workers employed by Russell Corporation in Alex City has been steadily declining.  More than 6,500 jobs have been lost as most operations have moved offshore and management is now headquartered in Bowling Green, Kentucky. , most of the manufacturing has been closed in Alex City and the majority of buildings are empty.

Transportation
T.C. Russell Field Airport (KALX), off U.S. Highway 280 adjacent to the Airport Industrial Park, is owned and maintained by the City of Alexander City. KALX does not provide scheduled passenger services. The nearest major airports are Birmingham and Montgomery.

Alexander City has no railway station. The nearest rail passenger services are provided at Anniston, which is served daily by Amtrak's The Crescent to Washington DC, Baltimore, Philadelphia and New York.

Alexander City has no scheduled intercity bus service. There is a service provided by Arise Transportation that schedules one stop rides with a 24-hour advance notice.

Gallery

References

External links
 City of Alexander City official site
 Alexander City Chamber of Commerce

Cities in Alabama
Populated places established in 1872
Alexander City micropolitan area
Cities in Tallapoosa County, Alabama
1872 establishments in Alabama